Norwegian Confederation of Trade Unions (LO) was founded in 1899, and has had the following leaders:

Leaders 
1899-1900: Hans G. Jensen
1900-1901: Dines Jensen
1901-1904: Adolf Pedersen
1904-1905: Joh. Johansen
1905-1906: Adolf Pedersen
1906-1925: Ole O. Lian
1925-1934: Halvard Olsen
1934-1939: Olav Hindahl
1939-1965: Konrad Nordahl
1965-1969: Parelius Mentsen
1969-1977: Tor Aspengren
1977-1987: Tor Halvorsen
1987-1989: Leif Haraldseth
1989-2001: Yngve Haagensen
2001-2007: Gerd-Liv Valla
2007-2013: Roar Flåthen
2013-2017: Gerd Kristiansen
2017-2021: Hans-Christian Gabrielsen
2021-inc.: Peggy Hessen Følsvik

Leaders during World War II 
Under World War II, LO was usurped by the Nazis, all other activity was illegal. Leaders of the legal LO were:

1940: Elias Volan
1940-1941: Jens Tangen
1941-1945: Odd Fossum
1945: Kåre Rein

External links
 Norwegian Confederation of Trade Unions - Official site

 
Trade unionists